The  is a training squadron belonging to the Fighter Training Group of the Air Training Command of the Japan Air Self-Defense Force. It is based at Nyutabaru Air Base in Miyazaki Prefecture, Japan. It was formerly the 202nd Tactical Fighter Squadron.

Aircraft operated
 Mitsubishi F-15J/DJ (2000-present)
 Kawasaki T-4 (2000-present)

References

Units of the Japan Air Self-Defense Force